Gideon Agido Ochieng is a Kenyan football coach and former player who served as coach at Kenyan Premier League sides Gor Mahia Congo United, and Nairobi City Stars.

Career
Gideon turned out as a fullback for Kenyan top-tier side Reunion F.C. in 1992, and Gor Mahia between 1992 and 1997. 

After his playing career, Ochieng served Gor Mahia as Secretary General for two years from 2003. He joined the same team as an assistant coach in 2009 then stepped up to become the head coach upon the exit of Raphael Auka. In 2010 he relinquished his position mid-season to the technical director Zedekiah Otieno. 

He joined Congo United for the 2010 season as head coach but lasted till April 2011 after a 4–0 loss to KCB. He then moved to Nairobi City Stars in August 2011 as a replacement for Kennedy Odhiambo on a caretaker basis before fully taking over for the 2012 season.

References

External links
 Gideon Ochieng

1967 births 
Living people
Kenyan football managers
Gor Mahia F.C. players
Gor Mahia F.C. managers
Kenyan footballers